KSUP is a commercial music radio station in Juneau, Alaska, broadcasting on 106.3 FM. The station changed from a rock format in the spring of 2007. The station is branded as "Mix 106".

In June 2008, MIX 106 and its sister station, KINY, were bought by Alaska Broadcast Communications. The stations studios are at the Juneau Radio Center, also home to sister stations KTKU, KINY and KJNO.

KSUP-HD2
On March 10, 2021, KSUP launched a sports format on its HD2 subchannel, branded as "Hawk 107.9" (simulcast on FM translator K300AB 107.9 FM Juneau), with programming from Fox Sports Radio.

Previous logo
KSUP logo under previous rock format

References

External links
KSUP official website

SUP
Hot adult contemporary radio stations in the United States